Acanthofrontia bianulata is a moth of the  subfamily Arctiinae. It is found in Tanzania.

References

Endemic fauna of Tanzania
Moths described in 1922
Erebid moths of Africa
Lithosiini